The family Saprospiraceae is composed of environmental bacteria. The members of this family are important to the breakdown of complex organic compounds in the environment.

References

Bacteroidota